Richard Eugene Frye is an American autism researcher and associate professor at Arizona Children's Hospital in Phoenix, and formerly of the University of Arkansas for Medical Sciences's department of pediatrics, as well as the Director of the Autism Multispecialty Clinic at Arkansas Children’s Hospital. Frye was formerly a faculty member at the University of Texas Health Science Center at Houston's division of child and adolescent neurology.

Education
Frye received his bachelor's degree from Long Island University C. W. Post Campus in 1986 in psychobiology. Five years later, he obtained his M.S. from Drexel University in biomedical science/biostatistics. Frye went on to obtain his PhD and MD degrees both in 1998, and both from Georgetown University. From 1998 to 2000 Frye completed a residency in pediatrics at Jackson Memorial Hospital, before traveling to Children's Hospital Boston (CHB) to complete another residency, this time in pediatric neurology. After completing his residencies, he completed a research fellowship in behavioral neurology and learning disabilities, also at CHB, from 2003 to 2005. From 2004 to 2005 Frye completed another research fellowship, this time at Boston University in psychology.

Research
Frye's most cited paper is one published in 1990, which studied the effects of cigarette smoking on the sense of smell. In fact, much of Frye's early research focused on olfaction.

Frye's more recent research focuses on the potential environmental causes of autism, as well as physiological abnormalities that have been observed in autistic individuals. Specifically, he and his co-authors, who include Dan Rossignol, have concluded that it is possible that autistic individuals suffer from immune dysregulation and oxidative stress, as well as that mitochondrial dysfunction is more common in such individuals than in the general population. In addition, Frye's research has concluded that autism may be caused by exposure to toxicants. Frye has also published research on the use of dietary supplements as autism treatments, including melatonin and tetrahydrobiopterin, and recently coauthored a review regarding treatments for children with both autism and seizures, which concluded that "limited evidence is available on the effectiveness of treatments for seizures in children with autism." However, Frye also said that this paper "...demonstrates that certain treatments could be beneficial for treating both autism symptoms and seizures at the same time." Another of Frye's studies concluded that many autistic children have abnormal levels of gut bacteria, and that these children exhibit abnormal energy metabolism as a result. Some have speculated that the results of this research "could create blood tests for early screening of the condition [i.e. autism]." In 2016, Frye contributed the foreword to a medical memoir of autistic siblings with abnormal gut bacteria and related biomarkers.

Selected publications

References

External links

Interview at Cogent Benger

Autism researchers
LIU Post alumni
Georgetown University School of Medicine alumni
Living people
University of Arkansas for Medical Sciences
University of Texas Health Science Center at Houston faculty
Year of birth missing (living people)